Kuttimannilbethel is a village located near Kalanjoor in Pathanamthitta district, Kerala, India.

Language
Malayalam is the native language of Kuttimannilbethel.

Politics
Kuttimannilbethel is a part of Pathanamthitta Loksabha constituency. Mr. Anto Antony is the current Member of Parliament of the constituency.

References 

Villages in Pathanamthitta district